The Twin Falls Tea House National Historic Site of Canada, located in Yoho National Park, British Columbia as  a resting place for hikers and trail riders in the park. The rustic structure is located near Twin Falls in the Little Yoho Valley. The first phase of construction took place about 1908. A separate two-story cabin was built adjoining the original cabin about 1923, and the two structures were linked between 1925 and 1928. Proposed for demolition in 1969, the Tea House was designated a National Historic Site of Canada in 1992, and was extensively renovated in 2005.

Construction
The first section of the Tea House was built by either the Canadian Pacific Railway or an outfitter associated with the railroad as a rest station for tour groups as the "Twin Falls Rest," formally leasing the land in 1922-23. The Tea House served meals, and was stated to be able to accommodate five overnight guests. It is located on a circuit trail that reaches the foot of Yoho Glacier and which affords a view of Twin Falls. An  trail branch provides access from Takakkaw Falls.

Description
The Tea House is of peeled log construction in the rustic style popular in national parks of the time. The logs are unusually massive for such a relatively small building. The 1923 addition uses logs of similar scale to the original cabin, but employs a Swiss chalet style in its design. The balcony of the addition provides a clear view of Twin Falls. The Tea House does not have running water or electricity; food is cooked on a wood-burning stove. Sanitation is provided by outhouses, lighting by kerosene lamps. To reduce impact on the trail system, firewood is delivered by helicopter.

History
The Tea House was operated by Canadian Pacific on a leasehold basis through the 1920s, 1930s and 1940s. In 1953 it was closed, as the rail tourism business declined in favor of automobile-borne tourism. In 1954 the Tea House and other CP properties were sold to Brewster and Ford Mountain Lodges Ltd., who reopened the Tea House in 1959. In 1969, Parks Canada proposed the demolition of the Tea House, citing poor repair and the absence of utilities. The seasonal proprietor, Fran Drummond, who had operated the Tea House since 1962, mounted a letter-writing campaign and gained support in the press, staving off demolition, and instigating repairs in the 1970s. In 1972 Fran Drummond took over the lease. Further repairs ensued, including a filtration system for the bucket-fed stream water supply for the kitchen and laundry. The Tea House was designated a National Historic Site of Canada in 1992. It is classified as a "recognized" Federal Heritage Building. In 2005 a $1 million renovation took place, funded partly by Heritage Canada.

See also
 Canadian Pacific Hotels

References

External links
 Parks Canada site
 Management Plans, National Historic Sites of the Mountain Parks, evaluation of the Tea House 
 Twin Falls Chalet Website

National Historic Sites in British Columbia
Rustic architecture in Canada
Yoho National Park
Houses completed in 1908
Buildings and structures on the National Historic Sites of Canada register
1908 establishments in British Columbia